Placaciura is a genus of tephritid  or fruit flies in the family Tephritidae.

Species
Placaciura alacris (Loew, 1869)

References

Tephritinae
Tephritidae genera
Diptera of Asia